Lissoberyx is an extinct genus of prehistoric ray-finned fish belongon to the family Trachichthyidae. Lissoberyx is a trachichthyid, but it shows more resemblance to the holocentrids than any other trachichthyid.

Fossil record
These fishes lived during the Cenomanian age (from 100.5 to 93.9 million years ago).

Description
These small deep-bodied fishes have 23 vertebrae, five spines in the dorsal fin, while anal fin has four spines, less than ten soft rays in each. Scales are thin, no ventral ridge scales. 

Lissoberyx dayi is the type species of the genus Lissoberyx. 

However, one of the specimens used by C. Patterson in his description of L. dayi must considered a representative of the type species (C. minimus) of a new genus, Cryptoberyx.

See also

 Prehistoric fish
 List of prehistoric bony fish

References 

Beryciformes
Late Cretaceous fish
Prehistoric ray-finned fish genera